Geoffrey Griffin or Geoff Griffin may refer to:

 Geoffrey William Griffin, Kenyan educator, founding director of Starehe Boys Centre and School
 Geoff Griffin (1939–2006), South African cricketer
 Jeff Griffin, American football player
 Jefferson Griffin, North Carolina Court of Appeals judge
 Geoffrey "Jeff" Griffin, a fictional character from the 1976 film Griffin and Phoenix, portrayed by Peter Falk